Madonna and Child with Angels and Saints was an oil on panel triptych by Filippo Lippi, executed in 1440. 

Its central panel has been in the Metropolitan Museum of Art in New York since 1949 and its side panels of Saints Augustine and Ambrose and Saints Gregory and Jerome are both in the Accademia Albertina in Turin. The work was probably split up around the end of the 18th Century. When archbishop Vincenzo Maria Mossi gave his collection to the Accademia in 1828 he only presented the two side panels. The work was reunited at the "Exposition de l'art italien de Cimabue à Tiepolo" in Paris in 1935 and in the "Filippo Lippi. Un trittico ricongiunto" exhibition at the Accademia in October 2004.

Reconstruction

References

Paintings in Turin
Paintings by Filippo Lippi
Paintings of the Madonna and Child by Filippo Lippi
1440 paintings
Triptychs
Paintings of the Madonna and Child
Paintings of Ambrose
Paintings of Augustine of Hippo
Paintings of Jerome
Paintings in the collection of the Metropolitan Museum of Art